The bumblebeewolf (Philanthus bicinctus) is a species of bee-hunting wasp (or "beewolf") of North America. It makes deep nests in soil. Males are territorial, often perching on grass near the burrow they occupy nocturnally. Females typically occupy a single nest throughout a season, with a maximum of 36 days spent in one burrow.

References

Crabronidae
Hymenoptera of North America
Insects described in 1916